Hard to Be a God is a 1964 science fiction novel by the Soviet writers Arkady and Boris Strugatsky, set in the Noon Universe.

Premise and themes
The novel follows Anton (alias Don Rumata throughout the book), an undercover operative from the future planet Earth, in his mission on an alien planet that is populated by human beings whose society has not advanced beyond the Middle Ages. The novel's core idea is that human progress throughout the centuries is often cruel and bloody, and that religion and blind faith can be effective tools of oppression, working to destroy the emerging scientific disciplines and enlightenment. The title refers to Anton's perception of his precarious role as an observer on the planet, for while he has far more advanced knowledge than the people around him, he is forbidden to assist too actively as his assistance would interfere with the natural progress of history. The book pays a lot of attention to the internal world of the main character, showing his own evolution from an emotionally uninvolved 'observer' to the person who rejects the blind belief in theory when confronted with the cruelty of real events.

Plot summary 
The prologue shows a scene from Anton's childhood (but real names of Arkanar people and locations pronounced allow to speculate that it is not childhood, but just a vacation in preparation to departure to the planet), in which he goes on an adventure with his friends Pashka (Paul) and Anka (Anna) and plays a game based on melodramatic recreations of events on the unnamed medieval planet. The children live in a futuristic utopia, and the teenagers feel drawn to adventure. While the children play they find an abandoned road with a road sign reading "Wrong way". Anton decides to go further and discovers remnants from World War II – a skeleton of a German gunner chained to his machine gun (or so he says to his friends).

Later, Anton and Pashka grow up to be observers on the aforementioned planet, Anton in the Arkanar Kingdom and Pashka in the Irukan Duchy. Anton has taken the role of Don Rumata. He  visits the Drunken Den, a meeting place for observers working in the Lands Beyond the Strait (Запроливье). He has the current task of investigating the disappearance of a famed scientist, Doctor Budach, who may have been kidnapped by Don Reba, the Prime Minister of Arkanar. Don Reba leads a campaign against all educated people in the kingdom, blaming them for all the calamities and misfortunes of the kingdom. Rumata feels alarmed, as the kingdom is changing into a fascist police state which would never have developed in equivalent medieval societies on Earth. Rumata has attempted to save the most talented poets, writers, doctors and scientists, smuggling them abroad into neighboring countries. However, Reba's régime murders or breaks most of his native friends.

Rumata tries to convince his colleagues that a more active intervention must take place. However, Don Goog (rendered in the 2014 English translation as Don Gug) (who had appeared earlier as Pashka) and Don Kondor (an elder and more experienced observer who's became a cult character for landing a helicopter behind a cottage, "having no time for scuffles on the road") feel that he has become too involved in native affairs and cannot see the historical perspective objectively. They remind him of the dangers of overly active meddling with the history of the planet. Not convinced, but left with no other choice, Rumata agrees to continue his work.

Back in the city, Rumata tries pumping multiple people for information, including Vaga (Waga in the 2014 English translation; Russian name: Вага Колесо; "вага" is a translatable Russian word as well) the Wheel, the head of local organised-crime. He also attends a soirée organised by Don Reba's lover, dona Okana, who is also rumored to be Don Reba's confidante. Rumata hopes to seduce her and pump her for information, however, he cannot hide the disgust of whoring himself out (and of Okana's lack of hygiene) and has to retreat. Rumata's love-interest, a young commoner named Kira, who can't stand the brutality and horrors of fascist Arkanar any longer, asks to stay in Rumata's house. Rumata gladly agrees and promises to eventually take her with him to "a wonderful place far far away", by which he means Earth.

His other plans take a bad turn. Life in Arkanar becomes less and less tolerable. Reba orders the torture and execution of dona Okana. Rumata – faced with the horrible consequences of his power-play – goes into a drunken stupor. Finally, left with no other option, in front of the King, Rumata openly accuses Don Reba of kidnapping a famous physician whom he (Rumata) had invited to tend to the King's maladies.

The ensuing events prove that Don Reba has anticipated and prepared for this. After confessing that he, in fact, kidnapped Dr. Budah, fearing that the man is not to be trusted with King's life, Don Reba apologizes. He then brings forward a physician, introducing him as Dr. Budah. The next night, Rumata, whose turn it is to guard the royal prince and only heir to the throne, is suddenly overwhelmed by dozens of Don Reba's men, and while fighting for his life witnesses them murdering the prince. They are in turn massacred by monks, apparently members of a Holy Order, a militaristic religious sect. Defeated, Rumata is brought in front of Don Reba.

Don Reba reveals that he has been watching Don Rumata for some time – in fact he recognizes Rumata as an impostor – the real Rumata having died a long time ago. However, Don Reba realizes that there is some supernatural power behind Rumata. Rumata's gold is of impossibly high quality and Rumata's sword-fighting style is unheard of, yet he has never killed a single person while staying in Arkanar despite fighting in numerous duels. Don Reba instinctively feels that killing Rumata may lead to retribution from Rumata's presumed demonic allies and tries to forge a treaty with him.

During their conversation, Rumata finally understands the magnitude of Reba's plotting. The presented physician was not Budah. The impostor was promised a position as the royal physician and was instructed to give the King a potion that was really a poison. The King died and the physician was executed for murdering the king. With the death of the royal prince during Rumata's guard and the king dead at the hands of "Budah", summoned by Rumata against Reba's wishes, Rumata can be easily blamed for staging a coup – in fact nobody would ever believe that he is not Reba's accomplice. In the same time, the organized-crime groups of Vaga the Wheel, secretly encouraged by Don Reba, begin to pillage the city.

Don Reba then calls in the Holy Order's army, which quickly dispatches the criminals and the guardsmen alike, seizing the defenceless city with minimal losses. Reba – who may have served as a pawn of the Holy Order from the beginning – has become a new head of state, a magister of the Holy Order and bishop and governor of Arkanar, now the Order's province.

Shocked and infuriated, Rumata still holds his ground, and forms a non-aggression pact with Don Reba. He uses his new status to rescue the real Dr. Budah as well as his own friend Baron Pampa from prison. Around him, Arkanar succumbs to the Holy Order. As the last of his friends and allies die and suffer in the turmoil, Rumata acts with all haste to expedite the departure of Budah.

Rumata returns to his home to discover his most loyal servant killed during a fight with a squad of Reba's stormtroopers who had gained entrance into the house; a unit of the Holy Order then saved the rest of the household.

The three observers meet again to discuss the future. Both his colleagues feel tortured by remorse, however, there is nothing to be done now. Don Kondor suggests that Rumata act carefully, as it is clear that Don Reba can go back on their deal at any moment. He warns Rumata that his lover Kira can be used against him, and that "all that we hold dear should be either in our hearts or on Earth".

Before Budah's departure, Rumata asks him a theological question: "what would you ask a god, if he could come from sky and fulfill any of your wishes?". After a long discussion – with Budah wishing and Rumata explaining the dire consequences of each of the wishes, Budah finally states that the only true gift a god could give the people is to leave them to their affairs. To this, Rumata replies that he cannot bear the sight of their suffering. Kira notices that Rumata referred to himself in that last sentence, rather than some hypothetical god, and looks at him "with horror and hope".

Budah crosses the border successfully and is saved. Feeling confident in his superior abilities and contacts in the military and the criminal world alike, Rumata plans to escape with Kira to Earth. A unit of soldiers arrives in order to capture Kira, considering Rumata absent from his home. In the confusion a crossbowman shoots her through the window. She dies in Rumata's arms. As the soldiers break the front door, Rumata, maddened with grief, unsheathes his swords and waits for them.

In the epilogue Pasha summarizes subsequent events to Anka while waiting for Anton in some recovery medical institution: the space station went on alert when the house was attacked. However, they haven't had a chance to react. Having had doused the entire city with a sleep-inducing gas, they had discovered that Anton-Rumata have already had fought his way through the city towards the palace, covered in blood, where he had finally presumably killed  Reba himself. Remembering the events of the prologue, Pashka wonders whether the episode when Anton decided to disobey the "Wrong way" sign and found 'a skeleton of a fascist', had a deeper meaning about the course of history.

History
According to Boris Strugatsky, the concept behind Hard to Be a God started as a "fun adventure story in the spirit of The Three Musketeers" while the brothers were writing Escape Attempt, which mentions a character who is a spy on another planet. It was originally titled Seventh Heaven and then renamed The Observer as they developed the novel. The backlash from the Manege Affair in 1962 caused the authors to rethink the tone of the novel. There was a sudden backlash against any form of abstract art, and it came to a head at a March 1963 meeting of the Moscow Writers' Organization when an argument broke out about the direction of Soviet science fiction being too abstract, and one story even being accused of supporting fascism. After that meeting, the brothers shifted the novel to be a "story about the fate of intelligentsia, submerged in the twilight of the middle ages", and finished writing in June 1963. In the process of sharing the manuscript with other writers and editors, they made many changes, including a suggestion from Ivan Yefremov that the character Don Rebia be changed to Don Reba because it was too obvious an anagram for Lavrentiy Beria. They didn't run into any censorship issues, but after the novel was published, some of their peers accused the book of abstractionism, surrealism, and pornography, and Yefremov published an article defending the novel from those allegations.

Translations
The first English translation of the novel by Wendayne Ackerman, published in 1973, was made from a German translation rather than the original Russian. In 2014 the Chicago Review Press published the first English translation, by Olena Bormashenko, made directly from the Russian original.

Reception
Theodore Sturgeon praised Hard to Be a God as "one of the most skillfully written, heavily freighted sf novels I have ever read," saying "The writing is well paced and the narrative is beautifully structured." Publishers Weekly wrote "The unadorned prose cloaks rich ideas, illustrating the ability of imaginative literature to probe troubling moral questions."

Adaptations
One of the most popular Strugatsky novels, Hard to Be a God was adapted multiple times in different media.

Theatrical films
 1989 film directed by Peter Fleischmann and starring Werner Herzog.
 2013 film known previously as History of the Arkanar Massacre, directed by Aleksei German.

Without Weapons
Without Weapons (Без оружия, Bez oruzhia) also known as A Man from a Distant Star (Человек с далёкой звезды, Chelovek s dalyokoy zvezdy) was a play created by the Strugatsky brothers themselves in 1989. It roughly followed the plot of the book and revealed several previously unknown details. Certain characters were also combined for the sake of brevity. The play was most likely created as a reaction to the Fleischmann film.

Video game

A role-playing video game of the same title, loosely based on the book, was developed by Burut Entertainment and Akella studios for the PC in 2007. The game is set immediately after the events in the book (known as the Arkanar Massacre), and so can be considered a sequel to the book. The player takes the role of a rookie imperial intelligence officer, straight out of the intelligence academy. The first mission is to investigate the disappearance of Don Rumata, and all the ramifications of his disappearance. It quickly becomes clear why an inexperienced rookie agent was chosen for such a complex mission: since the player character is young and inexperienced, their higher-ups are hoping that they fail so that the entire incident can be swept under the rug. The player eventually discovers the truth and begins to use the advanced weaponry of Earth offered during the mission.

See also

 Boris Strugatsky, Comments to the traversed: 1961–1963

References

External links
 
 The Official Site of Arkady and Boris Strugatsky – Life and Works
 PC game Hard to Be a God 

1964 science fiction novels
1964 in the Soviet Union
Noon Universe novels
Novels by Arkady and Boris Strugatsky
Russian novels adapted into films
Science fiction novels adapted into films